Xenophasmina   is an Asian genus of stick insects in the family Phasmatidae and subfamily Xeroderinae.  Species have a known distribution from Indo-China.

Species 
Xenophasmina includes the following species:
 Xenophasmina fimbriatum (Redtenbacher, 1908) - type species
 Xenophasmina simile (Redtenbacher, 1908)

References

External links
Images at iNaturealist

Phasmatodea genera
Phasmatodea of Indo-China
Phasmatidae
Phasmatodea of Asia